C. proximus may refer to:
 Carausius proximus, a phasmid species
 Chrosiothes proximus, a spider species in the genus Chrosiothes
 Conus proximus, a snail species
 Cymbopogon proximus, a grass species

See also
 Proximus (disambiguation)